Liechtenstein competed at the 1984 Summer Olympics in Los Angeles, United States.

Results by event

Athletics
Men's 100 metres
 Markus Büchel
 Heat — 10.98 (→ did not advance)

Men's 200 metres
 Markus Büchel
 Heat — 22.14 (→ did not advance)

Women's 1,500 metres 
 Helen Ritter 
 Heat — 4:19.39 (→ did not advance)

Women's 3,000 metres 
 Maria Ritter 
 Heat — did not start (→ did not advance)

Women's Heptathlon
 Manuela Marxer
 Final Result — 4913 points (→ 20th place)

Judo
Men's Competition
 Magnus Büchel
 Final Result   -86 kg (→ 7th place)
 Johannes Wohlwend
 Final Result   -71 kg (→ 9th place)

Shooting
Men's Competition
 Remo Sele
 Theo Schurte

References
sports-reference
Official Olympic Reports

Nations at the 1984 Summer Olympics
1984
1984 in Liechtenstein